Charmian or Charmion may refer to:

Charmion (1875–1949), American vaudeville trapeze artist and strongwoman
Charmion (servant to Cleopatra), one of Cleopatra's handmaids and confidantes, according to Plutarch
Charmian, the character in Shakespeare's Antony and Cleopatra
Charmian (Rome character), supporting character in Rome
Charmion (skipper), a synonym of the butterfly genus Celaenorrhinus
Charmian, Iran, a village in Hormozgan Province, Iran
Charmian II (Motorboat), a 1915 racing express cruiser, USS Charmian II (SP-696) 1917 to 1918

People with the given name
Charmian Campbell (1942–2009), British socialite and portrait painter
Charmian Carr (1942–2016), American actress, best known for her role as Liesl in The Sound of Music (1965)
Charmian Clift (1923–1969), Australian writer
Charmian Faulkner, Australian two-year-old who disappeared with her mother in 1980; see Louise and Charmian Faulkner disappearance
 Charmian Gadd, Australian violinist and 1962 winner of an ABC Young Performers Awards
Charmian Gooch, British social activist
Charmian Gradwell, British actress
Charmian Innes, British actress in movies such as Up for the Cup
Charmian Hussey, British writer
Charmian Johnson, Canadian curator and artist
Charmian Kittredge (1871–1955), American writer and second wife of Jack London
Charmion King (1925–2007), Canadian actress
Charmian May (1937–2002), British actress
Charmian Mellars, New Zealand basketballer
Charmian O'Connor, New Zealand organic chemist
Charmion von Wiegand (1896–1983), American artist and journalist
Charmian Woodfield (1929–2014), British archaeologist

See also

Charmaine (disambiguation)
Charmin, a brand of toilet paper owned by Procter & Gamble